Tanya Shirley (born 1976) is a Jamaican poet.

Life
Tanya Shirley was born in Jamaica in 1976. She attended high school in Canada before returning to Jamaica to study at the University of the West Indies, where she switched from studying social science to studying English literature. She later gained an MFA in creative writing from the University of Maryland. She teaches in the Department of Literatures as an adjunct lecturer at UWI, Mona.

Shirley's debut poetry collection, She Who Sleeps With Bones (2009), was a best-seller in Jamaica.

In 2017 she married Alan Johnstone, a financial investigator.

Works
 She who sleeps with bones. Leeds, UK: Peepal Tree, 2009.
 The merchant of feathers. Leeds: Peepal Tree, 2014.

References

1976 births
Living people
21st-century Jamaican poets
Jamaican women poets
University of the West Indies alumni
University of Maryland, College Park alumni